The men's 4 × 100 metre medley relay event at the 2020 Summer Olympics was held on 30 July and 1 August 2021 at the Tokyo Aquatics Centre. It was the event's sixteenth consecutive appearance, having been held at every edition since 1960.

The United States extended their dominance in the event, having won it every time since its introduction in 1960, except for the boycotted 1980 Games.

Records
Prior to this competition, the existing world and Olympic records were as follows.

The following record was established during the competition:

Qualification

 
The top 12 teams in this event at the 2019 World Aquatics Championships qualified for the Olympics. An additional 4 teams will qualify through having the fastest times at approved qualifying events during the qualifying period (1 March 2019 to 30 May 2020).

Competition format

The competition consists of two rounds: heats and a final. The relay teams with the best 8 times in the heats advance to the final. Swim-offs are used as necessary to break ties for advancement to the next round.

Schedule
All times are Japan Standard Time (UTC+9)

Results

Heats
The relay teams with the top 8 times, regardless of heat, advanced to the final.

Final

References

Men's 4 x 100 metre medley relay
Olympics
Men's events at the 2020 Summer Olympics